Fire Over England is a 1936 English adventure novel written by A. E. W. Mason. The book is set in the late 16th century and covers the English response ('Britain' did not yet exist) to the threat of the 1588 Spanish Armada; it is a thinly veiled analogy to the international situation facing Britain in 1936, a point explicitly made by Mason in his Preface to the first edition. 

The story begins in 1581 when the hero Robin Aubrey is at Eton; a few years previously, his father George was arrested for the possession of 'heretical literature' while travelling in Spain and supposedly executed. Robin becomes obsessed with avenging his father by funding a private naval expedition to destroy the Spanish treasure convoy, an ambition he is careful to hide from others. Just before departure, he attends a house party at the home of the Bannets, his scheming Catholic neighbours where he meets the beautiful Cynthia Norris and they fall in love. 

A number of historical figures appear in the novel, including Francis Walsingham who summons Robin to a meeting and reveals that George is still alive. He asks Robin to spy for him in Spain instead of going on the expedition, with the incentive being that he can then rescue his father. The rest of the story concerns Robin's adventures on that mission, ending with him making his way home on board the Armada itself.

Mason is careful to appear even handed in his treatment of the various personalities, including Phillip of Spain and Santa Cruz; while this now appears naive in the extreme, the purpose was to show there were men of goodwill on all sides. In another parallel with the political divisions of the 1930s, the treacherous Bannets are portrayed as a tiny minority, with the vast majority of Englishmen putting aside their religious differences to unite against a common foe.

Adaptation
The novel's subject matter was so current that in 1937, less than a year after publication, it was adapted as a film Fire Over England starring Vivien Leigh, Flora Robson and Laurence Olivier.

References

External links
 

1936 British novels
English adventure novels
Novels by A. E. W. Mason
English historical novels
1936 in England
England in fiction
Novels set in the 16th century
British novels adapted into films